Hubbard Bowyer McDonald (March 4, 1850 - March 2, 1907) was chief clerk to the Secretary of the United States Senate and Parliamentarian of the United States Senate.

Biography
He was born on March 4, 1850, in Washington, D.C., to William J. McDonald and Ann Belle Holt.

He died on March 2, 1907, of liver cancer at the Bachelor Apartment House in Washington, D.C.

References

Deaths from liver cancer
Parliamentarians of the United States Senate
1850 births
1907 deaths